Gerrha was an ancient and renowned city within Eastern Arabia, on the west side of the Persian Gulf.

History 
Prior to Gerrha, the area belonged to the Dilmun civilization, which was conquered by the Assyrian Empire in 709 BC. Gerrha was the center of an Arab kingdom from approximately 650 BC to circa AD 300. The kingdom was attacked by Antiochus III the Great in 205-204 BCE who succeeded in conquering modern Bahrain, although Gerrha seems to have survived in modern day Oman. It is currently unknown exactly when Gerrha fell, but the area in Eastern Arabia was invaded by the Iranian Sasanian Empire’s forces after AD 300.

Description 
Strabo described the city as having "fancy tools made out of gold and silver, such as the family gold, right [Qawa'im] triangles, and their drinking glass, let alone their large homes which have their doors, walls, roofs filled with colors, gold, silver, and holy stones"

Location and etymology 
To the Ancient Greeks, eastern Arabia (the present-day al-Hasa province) was known as Gerrha after its capital city. Gerrha was a Greek alteration of the Arabic Hajar (present-day Hofuf), the name of the largest city of ancient Bahrayn (Bahrayn was also known as Hagar or Gerrha in Hellenistic times). Other English spellings are Hajar Hufuf, Hajar Hasa' Hajarah. Hagar (Gerrha) is not to be confused with the west Arabian Al-Hijr (al-Hijrah, ancient Hegra), the present-day Mada'in Saleh or al-Ula near the Red Sea. Al-Hamdani says the etymology of Hajar means ‘large village’ in the Himyaritic language (derived from Hakar).

Another location suggested as Gerrha is Thaj which was built in the period of the Greeks, after the conquest of Alexander in 330 BC.  

The city of Gerrha was taken by the Qarmatians at the end of the ninth century. The researcher Abdulkhaliq Al Janbi argued in his book that Gerrha was most likely the ancient city of Hajar, located in modern-day Al-Ahsa, Saudi Arabia. Al-Janbi's theory is the most widely accepted one by modern scholars, although there are some difficulties with this argument, given that Al-Ahsa is 60 km inland and thus less likely to be the starting point for a trader's route, making a location within the archipelago of islands comprising the modern Kingdom of Bahrain, particularly the main island of Bahrain itself, another possibility.

Origins of the inhabitants of Gerrha 
Strabo described the inhabitants as Arabs, saying, "Because of their trade, the Gerrhans became the richest of the Arabs". Other sources agree that the inhabitants were indeed Arab. Petroglyphs that were found in Greece were found to have been sent by a man from Gerrha called 'Taym Al Lat', an Arab name that means 'servant of Al-lat'.

See also 
 Chaldea
 Eastern Arabia
 Uqair, an ancient fort suggested by some historians as the location of Gerrha

Footnotes

References 
 Bibby, Geoffrey (1970). Looking for Dilmun. Collins, London. .
 Potts, D. T. (1990). The Arabian Gulf in Antiquity Volume II: From Alexander the Great to the Coming of Islam. Oxford, Clarendon Press.

Archaeological sites in Saudi Arabia
Ancient cities of the Middle East
Former populated places in Southwest Asia
Populated places along the Silk Road
History of Eastern Arabia